The DFS Model 6 was a target glider built by Deutsche Forschungsanstalt für Segelflug in 1936.  It was intended for anti-aircraft training, but only prototypes were built.  It was assigned the RLM designation 8-6.

References 

Glider aircraft
DFS aircraft
Aircraft first flown in 1936